Integrated Transport Centre (ITC) is an organ of Department of Municipalities and Transport in the Emirate of Abu Dhabi, United Arab Emirates. It is tasked with overseeing public transport operations and management of parking spaces besides handling a range of other relevant duties like supervising traffic monitoring centers and logistical facilities of freight surface transport. It was established in November 2016 by then President of the United Arab Emirates Sheikh Khalifa al-Nahyan.

References 

Government agencies of Abu Dhabi
Transport in Abu Dhabi
Public transport in the United Arab Emirates
2016 establishments in the United Arab Emirates